John Rosa (1905–1967) was an Australian rugby league footballer who played in the 1930s.

Playing career
He was a premiership winning five-eighth for the Western Suburbs. He played two seasons of first grade between 1930–1931, which included winning the 1930 Grand Final.

Death
Rosa died at Merrylands, New South Wales on 14 July 1967.

References

1905 births
1967 deaths
Western Suburbs Magpies players
Australian rugby league players
Rugby league players from Sydney
Rugby league five-eighths
Rugby league locks